Swedish champions may refer to:
List of Swedish bandy champions
List of Swedish bandy champions (players)
List of Swedish bandy champions
List of Swedish football champions
List of Swedish football champions (players)
List of Swedish women's football champions
List of Swedish women's football champions (players)
List of Swedish youth football champions
List of Swedish men's handball champions
List of Swedish ice hockey champions
List of Swedish ice hockey champions (players)
List of Swedish ice hockey junior champions
Lists of Swedish Swimming Championships champions
List of Swedish Swimming Championships champions (men)
List of Swedish Swimming Championships champions (women)
List of Swedish Short Course Swimming Championships champions
List of Swedish Short Course Swimming Championships champions (men)
List of Swedish Short Course Swimming Championships champions (women)